Samaantharangal is a 1998 Malayalam drama film written and directed by Balachandra Menon. The film stars Menon himself along with Maathu, Renuka and Sukumari in supporting roles.

The film depicts the clash between father and son and won several awards including two National Film Awards at 45th National Film Awards. Balachandra Menon portrayed the role of station master father and was acclaimed for his performance. The film is noted for Menon who managed nine departments for the film; producer, director, story, screenplay, dialogues, actor, editor, music and distribution with also winning the National Film Award for Best Actor.

Plot 

Ismail is a Station master of Meenakshipuram, a small town located on the borders of Kerala. He is accompanied by his family consisting of an aged ailing mother, a wife, two daughters, three sons and a grandson.

Ayshumma, Ismail's mother, is proud of Ismail for his honesty and integrity with which he binds everybody; whereas his second wife, Razia, expects him to accept bribes so that she can manage the household more efficiently. Ameena, an elder daughter from his first wife, is a married to Jamal who works on ship but has gone missing for long time. Ismail's elder son Najeeb is an ambitious youngster who wants to do business and earn money.

In order to follow his dreams, Najeeb asks his father some money so that he can open a telephone booth but then Ismail rejects and advises him to concentrate on studies. Disappointed with Ismail's behaviour, Najeeb decides to leave the house for his own future. He gets introduced to a political leader who convinces Najeeb that politics would help him fulfill his dreams. A political activist now, Najeeb and his political party decides to do complete railway lockout (Bandh) in the country so that the party can become popular. To achieve this, they decide to remove railway tracks. Knowing Ismail, Najeeb secretly informs Razia about this and asks her to convince Ismail not to go on duty on that day.

Razia unsuccessfully tries to convince Ismail but he rejects all her plea and goes for duty. At the station, he learns about Bandh and also learns that Najeeb is an active member of the plan. Knowing about railway tracks being sabotaged, Ismail tries to inform the loco pilot to avoid accident. Too late to warn the loco pilot, Ismail runs on the railway tracks himself to stop the train. He successfully stops the train and avoids accident but not before he has been run over.

Cast 

 Balachandra Menon as Ismail
 Akhil Gopakumar as Jamal's son
 Rajesh Rajan as Najeeb
 Sai Kumar as Political leader
 Sukumari as Aishu  
 Maathu as Amina
 Madhu as Minister
 Renuka as Raziya
 Jose Pellissery as Financier
 Gopi as Musaliyar
 Madhupal as Jamal
 Viji Thampi as Matthew
 Poojappura Radhakrishnan as Vasu
 Kundara Johny as Roy
 Ravi Vallathol as Murali
 Usharani as Mary
 Arya as Mrs. Murali

Soundtrack

Awards 

The film won several awards for Balachandra Menon including National Film Award for Best Actor at 45th National Film Awards.

Filmfare Awards South

 1998 - Filmfare Award for Best Actor – Malayalam - Balachandra Menon

Kerala State Film Award

 1997 - Kerala State Film Award (Special Jury Award) - Balachandra Menon

 Asianet Film Awards
 1998 - Asianet Film Award for Best Supporting Actress for Sukumari.

 National Film Awards

 1997 - Best Actor - Balachandra Menon
Citation: For his realistic and sensitive portrayal of a middle-class man who stands up for his high principles.

 1997 - Best Film on Family Welfare
Citation: For an original script evolved from personal experience in a film that nurtures family and community life. The protagonist makes sacrifices in order to project the emotional and moral needs of his family members and through them projects a larger picture of the National Interests that bind us all.

References

External links 

1990s Malayalam-language films
1998 films
Films directed by Balachandra Menon
Films featuring a Best Actor National Award-winning performance
Best Film on Family Welfare National Film Award winners